Brahmachari may refer to:

 Brahmachari, a male who practices brahmacharya, a type of living as per Hindu Vedic Scriptures, feminine Brahmacharini
 Brahmachari, a prominent surname / title among the Bengali people of West Bengal, Assam and Bangladesh.
Dhirendra Brahmachari (1924–1994), Indian Yogi
Shuddhaanandaa Brahmachari (born 1949), motivational speaker from Kolkata, India
Brahmachari (1938 film), a 1938 Marathi film starring Meenakshi Shirodkar, Master Vinayak
Brahmachari (1968 Hindi film), a 1968 film starring Shammi Kapoor, Rajshree and Pran
Brahmachari (1968 Telugu film), a 1968 film starring Akkineni Nageswara Rao and Jayalalitha
Brahmachari (1972 film), a 1972 Malayalam language film
Brahmachari (1992 film), a 1992 Tamil language film
Brahmachari (2019 film), a 2019 Kannada language film

See also 
 Mr. Brahmachari, a 2003 Indian film

Sanskrit words and phrases